Tristan Honsinger (born October 23, 1949) is an American cello player active in free jazz and free improvisation.  He is perhaps best known for his long-running collaboration with free jazz pianist Cecil Taylor and guitarist Derek Bailey.

Born in Burlington, Vermont, United States, Honsinger was given music lessons from a very early age, as his mother had hopes of creating a chamber orchestra together with his brother and sister. At the age of 12, Tristan would give concerts on a nearly weekly basis. He studied classical cello at the New England Conservatory in Boston before moving to Montreal in 1969 to avoid the draft. While in Canada, he became interested in improvisational music. Honsinger moved to Europe in 1974 and was active throughout the continent. He operates from Amsterdam in the Netherlands.

Honsinger has a striking appearance, with body language reminiscent of that of a slapstick actor.

He has experimented with a combo of three string-players (violin, cello and double bass) and drums in 1991, under the name Fields in Miniature, and has worked in other musical fields, including collaborations with UK post punk band The Pop Group in 1979, The Ex during the early 1990s and Ig Henneman Tentet.

According to Dutch Volkskrant journalist Erik van de Berg, "Honsinger is someone who hasn't lost his childhood fantasy entirely. His compositions are like a child's drawing, or even more like a story from Winnie The Pooh: awkward and touchingly simple, yet full of deeper meanings for those who want to see them."  In the same article, Honsinger commented: "Simple things fascinate me, simple stories and simple characters. It's not that I write for children in particular, but I think they would understand it very well. I usually get the best reactions from an audience with a good mix of children and adults. I don't like to play for one particular age group. It is almost a necessity for me to compose in the form of stories and texts. It gives me ideas and it does help the musicians in their improvisation if they can think: this story is about a little man who takes a walk and experiences this, that and the other. It also helps the audience, it gives them something to hold on to."

Discography (selected)

External links
 Discography and biography
Honsingers FMP releases

References

Aut Records
Aut Records artists
1949 births
Living people
Musicians from Burlington, Vermont
Avant-garde jazz musicians
Free improvisation
American jazz cellists
American male jazz musicians
ICP Orchestra members
Incus Records artists
FMP/Free Music Production artists